Cédric Pardeilhan (born May 4, 1976 in Pau, Pyrénées-Atlantiques, France) is a coach and former footballer who played as a defender. He currently coaches Genêts Anglet.

References

External links
 Cédric Pardeilhan profile at chamoisfc79.fr
 

1976 births
Living people
French footballers
Association football defenders
Paris Saint-Germain F.C. players
Toulouse FC players
Le Mans FC players
AC Ajaccio players
Chamois Niortais F.C. players
AS Beauvais Oise players
Ligue 1 players
Ligue 2 players
Pau FC players
Sportspeople from Pau, Pyrénées-Atlantiques
Footballers from Nouvelle-Aquitaine